This is a list of current and former individual local Pentecostal places of worship, i.e. church buildings and congregations, that are individually notable. Some may be notable for their historic buildings listed on a historic register.  This is not a list of Pentecostal denominations or movements.

Australia 

The International Network of Churches (formerly the Christian Outreach Centre) and Australian Christian Churches are networks of Pentecostal churches in Australia. Individual churches include:

Bayside Church
Citipointe Church
CityLife Church
Hillsong Brisbane Campus
Hillsong Church
Inspire Church
Kings Christian Church
Influencers Church
Planetshakers Church
Potter's House
Shirelive Church
Youth Alive

Canada 
Central Pentecostal Tabernacle, Edmonton, Alberta

Ghana 
Prayer Cathedral of Action Chapel International, Accra Ghana

Hong Kong 
Corner Stone International Church of God, Kowloon
Wing Kwong Pentecostal Holiness Church, Lok Fu, Wong Tai Sin District

India 
Indian Pentecostal Church of God
General Council of the Assemblies of God of India
Church of God (Full Gospel) in India
The Pentecostal Mission
Synod of Independent Pentecostal Church

Indonesia 
Gereja Bethany Indonesia, Surabaya, Indonesia, a megachurch

Iran 
Assyrian Pentecostal Church, Kermanshah

New Zealand 
City Impact Church New Zealand, East Coast Bays

Nigeria 
Salvation Ministries, Port Harcourt, Rivers State
Redeemed Christian Church of God, Lagos, a megachurch

Norway 

 Filadelfia Oslo

Pakistan 

United Pentecostal Church in Pakistan
Emmanuel Pentecostal Church, Abbottabad
Jesus Pentecostal Church (Street# 4, Barkatpura, Faisalabad)
Paraclete Pentecostal Ministries - Pakistan, Ghotki-Sindh
Philadelphia Pentecostal Church, Islamabad
Paraclete Pentecostal Ministries, Islamabad
United Pentecostal Church, Islamabad
Reformed Pentecostal Church of Pakistan, New Iqbal Town, Islamabad
Grace of Christ Pentecostal Church, Karachi
Philadelphia Pentecostal Church, Karachi
Philadelphia Pentecostal Church, Kasur
Holy City Pentecostal Church (HCPCM), Multan
Elohim Pentecostal Church, Peshawar
Philadelphia Pentecostal Church, Quetta
Jesus Pentecostal Church, Quetta
New Smyrna Pentecostal Church Bashirabad, Quetta
Reformed Pentecostal Church of Pakistan, Dhok Kala Khan, Rawalpindi
Philadelphia Pentecostal Church, Sialkot
Christos International Church, Gujranwala, Pakistan

Philippines 
Cathedral of Praise, Manila, a megachurch

Singapore 
New Creation Church, Buona Vista, Queenstown, a megachurch

Sweden 
Habo Pentecostal Church, Habo
Jönköping Pentecostal Church, Jönköping
Mullsjö Pentecostal Church, Mullsjö
Filadelfiakyrkan, Stockholm
Umeå Pentecostal Church, Umeå

United Kingdom 

Church of Pentecost, Green Lane Dagenham, London
Peniel Pentecostal Church, Pilgrims Hatch, Brentwood, Essex
Universal Church of the Kingdom of God, London and elsewhere
Jubilee International Church, London
Ealing Christian Centre, London
Kensington Temple, London
Kingsway International Christian Centre, London
Living Word Christian Fellowship, London
New Wine Church, London
City of Faith Church, London
Christian Centre, Nottingham, Nottingham
The Kingsborough Centre, Uxbridge, Uxbridge

United States 

Church of God (Cleveland, Tennessee)
Church of God (Huntsville, Alabama)
Garywood Assembly of God, Alabama
Wasilla Assembly of God, Wasilla, Alaska
Phoenix First Assembly of God, Phoenix, Arizona
Melodyland Christian Center, Anaheim, California
Angelus Temple, Los Angeles, California, a U.S. National Historic Landmark
Dream Center, Los Angeles, California
West Angeles Church of God in Christ, Los Angeles, California
Bethel Church (Redding, California)
Crossroads Community Cathedral, East Hartford, Connecticut
Word of Life Christian Church, Chadwicks, New York
World Harvest Church Columbus, Ohio
Jesus Name Pentacostal Church Yelm, Washington
Charismatic Episcopal Church, Malverne, New York

References